Speakeasy is the debut studio album from Farnborough based rock band Freeze the Atlantic. The album features a re-recorded version of "The Alibi" as well as a full band version of "Broken Bones" from their Colour by Numbers EP.

Track listing

Personnel
Freeze the Atlantic
Chris Knott - vocals
Andy Gilmour - guitar/vocals
Tom Stevens - guitar/piano/vocals
Sean Shreeve - bass/vocals
Guy Davis - drums/percussion

Guest vocalists
 Liv Puente – vocals on "Volcanoes"
 Colin Doran – vocals on "Loses All The Romance"
 JP Reid – vocals on "The Alibi"

Additional personnel 
 Harry White – strings on "Crestfallen"

References

External links 

2012 debut albums
Alcopop! Records albums
Freeze the Atlantic albums